Othusitse Pilane (born 26 February 1984) is a Botswana footballer, who currently plays for Mochudi Centre Chiefs and Botswana national football team at 2012 Africa Cup of Nations as a midfielder.

Notes

External links
 

1984 births
Living people
Botswana footballers
Botswana international footballers
2012 Africa Cup of Nations players
Mochudi Centre Chiefs SC players
Association football midfielders